The River Roeburn is a river in Lancashire, England.

Sourced at Salter Fell, the Roeburn flows northwards through Roeburndale to Wray, where it falls into the River Hindburn.

Flash flooding of the river in 1967 caused substantial damage to the village of Wray.

References

External links

Roeburn, River
Roeburn
Forest of Bowland
3Roeburn